Hamilton Emanuel Piedra Ordóñez (born Loja, Ecuador, 20 February 1993) is an Ecuadorean professional footballer who plays as a goalkeeper for Deportivo Cuenca on loan from C.S.D. Independiente del Valle in the Ecuadorian Serie A.

Piedra joined C.D. Cuenca in 2011 and became established as first choice goalkeeper in 2014, going on to make 157 league appearances for the club. Piedra was announced as joining Independiente on a 5 year contract in a cash plus players deal in November 2017.

International career
Piedra made his debut for the senior Ecuador side on July 27, 2017 against the Trinidad and Tobago national football team in a 3-1 international friendly victory held at the Estadio George Capwell.

References

External links
Hamilton Piedra profile at Federación Ecuatoriana de Fútbol 

1993 births
Living people
People from Loja, Ecuador
Association football goalkeepers
Ecuadorian footballers
Ecuadorian Serie A players
C.D. Cuenca footballers
C.S.D. Independiente del Valle footballers
Ecuador international footballers